The SH8 highway is a national highway in Albania spanning  across the counties of Fier and Vlorë. It connects the cities of Fier and Vlorë to the city of Sarandë on the Albanian Ionian Sea Coast. The road was built in 1920.

Route  

The National Road SH8 branches off from the National Road SH4 in Fier and leads the city of Vlorë. From Vlorë, the road crosses the Llogara Pass, to the Albanian Riviera near Dhërmi and through Himarë to Sarandë. It ends at the city center of Sarandë.

Gallery

See also 
 Transport in Albania
 A2 (Albania)

References

External links 

SH08 (Albania)
Transport in Fier County
Transport in Vlorë County